State trading enterprises are enterprises authorized to engage in trade (exporting and/or importing) that are owned, sanctioned, or otherwise supported by government.  STEs are legitimate trading entities and are subject to GATT rules.  Examples include the Canadian Wheat Board, the Australian Wheat Board, and historically, the New Zealand Dairy Board in New Zealand.  

Historically the Milk Marketing Board operated in the UK and along with WTO free trade movements has been dissolved. An operating State Trading Organization exists in the Maldives.

Some U.S. agricultural producers think, however, that STEs through their exercise of monopoly power and government support may distort trade in their respective commodities.

See also

 Commodity Credit Corporation
 Foreign Market Development Program
 Food, Conservation, and Energy Act of 2008
 Marketing board

References 

International trade